Kalliyankattu Neeli is a 1979 Indian Malayalam-language horror film,  directed by M. Krishnan Nair and produced by M. Mani. The film stars Madhu, Jayabharathi, Jagathy Sreekumar and Sudheer in the lead roles. The film has musical score by Shyam.

Cast
 
Madhu as Hemachandran
Jayabharathi as Latha, Latha's sister (disguised as Neeli) double role
Sudheer as Neelamma's husband
Jagathy Sreekumar as Ugran Vaasu
Manavalan Joseph as Watcher Velappan Pillai
Praveena as Neelamma
Mancheri Chandran as Sunny
Adoor Bhavani as Gouriyamma
Aryad Gopalakrishnan as Govindan
Noohu as Shankari
Paravoor Bharathan as Suryakaladi Bhattadiri
Pushpa as Dolly
T. P. Madhavan as Hippie
Veeran as Settu

Soundtrack

References

External links
 

1979 films
1970s Malayalam-language films
Films directed by M. Krishnan Nair
Films scored by Shyam (composer)